Neomida is a genus of darkling beetles in the family Tenebrionidae. There are about 18 described species in Neomida.

Species
These 18 species belong to the genus Neomida:

 Neomida armata (Laporte de Castelnau & Brullé, 1831) g
 Neomida atricollis (Pic, 1926) g
 Neomida bicornis (Fabricius, 1777) g b
 Neomida bituberculata Olivier, 1791 g
 Neomida castanea (Bates, 1873) g
 Neomida convexa Pic, 1926 g
 Neomida deltocera Triplehorn, 1994 g
 Neomida ferruginea b
 Neomida haemorrhoidalis (Fabricius, 1787) g
 Neomida hoffmannseggi (Laporte de Castelnau & Brullé, 1831) g
 Neomida inermis Champion, 1886 g
 Neomida lecontii (Bates, 1873) g
 Neomida luteonotata (Pic, 1926) g
 Neomida minuta (Pic, 1926) g
 Neomida picea (Laporte de Castelnau & Brullé, 1831) g
 Neomida pogonocera Triplehorn, 1994 g
 Neomida suilla (Champion, 1896) g
 Neomida vitula (Chevrolat, 1878) g

Data sources: i = ITIS, c = Catalogue of Life, g = GBIF, b = Bugguide.net

References

Further reading

External links

 

Tenebrionidae